Riko Simanjuntak (born 26 January 1992) is an Indonesian professional footballer who plays as a winger for Liga 1 club Persija Jakarta. Before he joined Persija, he had changed clubs four times. He is sometimes called Ucok and is often a mainstay player for the team in Indonesian competitions.

Club career

PSMS Medan
In 2010-12, before he joined PSMS Medan, Simanjuntak was an amateur futsal player in Pematangsiantar, North Sumatera. He and his brother Johan Simanjuntak always played together in one team. Simanjuntak plays as a right flank, Johan as a left flank. Once, PSMS's Coach Suimin Diharja watched their futsal match together. Simanjuntak and Johan's speed, agility, and sharpness made the coach interested in recruiting him. Finally Simanjuntak and Johan joined PSMS and played for PSMS Medan who were then playing in the Indonesia Super League. This was Simanjuntak's first football club.

PS Bangka
After the chaotic league dualism, a year later, Simanjuntak did not get a League 1 team. He finally joined and played for Liga 2 club PS Bangka. This is where he showed his abilities in the field. In the 18 games he played, Simanjuntak scored 7 goals.

Gresik United
In the 2015 season, Simanjuntak signed a year's contract with Persegres Gresik United. He made his debut in a 0–1 away win against Barito Putera on 11 April. He scored his first goal in a 2–1 home win against Borneo, scoring after 45 minutes.

Semen Padang
In 2016 Simanjuntak signed with Semen Padang for the Indonesia Soccer Championship A. He made 66 league appearances and scored 4 goals for Semen Padang.

Persija Jakarta
In 2018, Simanjuntak signed a contract with Indonesian Liga 1 club Persija Jakarta. He made his debut on 23 March 2018 in a match against Bhayangkara. On 8 June 2018, Simanjuntak scored his first goal for Persija against TIRA-Persikabo in the 85th minute at the Sultan Agung Stadium, Bantul.

International career

Riko played for the Indonesia national team at the 2018 AFF Championship and the 2022 FIFA World Cup qualification.

On March 2023, Riko was named in Indonesia's squad by Manager Shin Tae-Yong for two friendly matches against Burundi. The selection was met with surprise, as it marked his return to the national side after four years.

Career statistics

Club

International

Honours

Club honors

Persija Jakarta
 Liga 1: 2018
 Indonesia President's Cup: 2018
Menpora Cup: 2021

Individual 
Liga 1 Best Eleven: 2018
 
 ASEAN Football Federation Best XI: 2019
AFC Cup  All-time XI: Wide midfielders

References

External links 
 

1992 births
Living people
Batak people
Indonesian footballers
People from Simalungun Regency
Sportspeople from North Sumatra
Indonesian Premier Division players
Liga 1 (Indonesia) players
PSMS Medan players
Persegres Gresik players
Gresik United players
Semen Padang F.C. players
Persija Jakarta players
Indonesia international footballers
Association football midfielders
21st-century Indonesian people